The 1942 Tulane Green Wave football team represented Tulane University as a member of the Southeastern Conference (SEC) during the 1942 college football season. Led by first-year head coach Claude Simons Jr., the Green Wave played their home games at Tulane Stadium in New Orleans. Tulane finished the season with an overall record of 4–5 and a mark of 1–4 in conference play, placing tenth in the SEC.

Schedule

References

Tulane
Tulane Green Wave football seasons
Tulane Green Wave football